Chlorocoma is a genus of moths in the family Geometridae.

Species
 Chlorocoma asemanta (Meyrick, 1888)
 Chlorocoma assimilis (Lucas, 1888)
 Chlorocoma cadmaria (Guenée, 1857)
 Chlorocoma carenaria (Guenée, 1857)
 Chlorocoma cyclosema Turner, 1941
 Chlorocoma dichloraria (Guenée, 1857)
 Chlorocoma externa (Walker, 1861)
 Chlorocoma haplochlora (Meyrick, 1888)
 Chlorocoma ipomopsis (Lower, 1892)
 Chlorocoma melocrossa (Meyrick, 1888)
 Chlorocoma monocyma (Meyrick, 1888)
 Chlorocoma neptunus (Butler, 1886)
 Chlorocoma paraphylla (Lower, 1902)
 Chlorocoma pediobates Turner, 1939
 Chlorocoma periphracta (Turner, 1904)
 Chlorocoma rhodocrossa (Turner, 1906)
 Chlorocoma rhodoloma Turner, 1910
 Chlorocoma rhodothrix Turner, 1922
 Chlorocoma stereota (Meyrick, 1888)
 Chlorocoma tachypora Turner, 1910
 Chlorocoma tetraspila (Lower, 1901)
 Chlorocoma vertumnaria (Guenée, 1857)

References
 Chlorocoma at Markku Savela's Lepidoptera and Some Other Life Forms
 Natural History Museum Lepidoptera genus database

Geometrinae